Luzayadio Andy Bangu (born 10 October 1997) is a DR-Congolese footballer who plays as a midfielder for Italian Serie D club Aglianese.

Club career

Fiorentina

2016–17 season: Loan to Reggina 
On 19 August, Bangu was signed by Serie C side Reggina on a season-long loan deal. On 26 August, Bangu made his Serie C debut for Reggina as a starter in a 3–1 away defeat against Fondi, he was replaced by Andrea Bianchimano in the 86th minute. On 14 September, Bangu scored his first professional goal, as a substitute, in the 78th minute of a 1–1 home draw against Catania. On 18 September he played his first entire match for Reggina, a 1–1 away draw against Monopoli. On 9 October he scored his second goal and the winning goal of the match in the 59th minute of a 1–0 home win over Juve Stabia. On 29 December he was sent off with a red card in the 84th minute of a 2–0 away defeat against Messina. On 25 February, Bangu scored his third goal in the 41st minute of a 3–3 away draw against Juve Stabia. On 5 March he scored his fourth goal 20th minute of a 3–0 home win over Casertana. On 23 April he scored his fifth goal, as a substitute, in the 82nd minute of a 3–2 home win over Virtus Francavilla. Bangu ended his season-long loan to Reggiana with 33 apparences, 5 goals and 1 assist.

2017–18 season: Loan to Vicenza 
On 22 July, Bangu was loaned to Serie C side Vicenza on a season-long loan deal. On 30 July, Bangu made his debut for Vicenza as a starter in a 4–1 home win over Pro Piacenza in the first round of Coppa Italia, he was replaced by Federico Giraudo in the 72nd minute. On 6 August he played in the second round in a 3–1 home defeat against Foggia, he was replaced by Marco Romizi in the 77th minute. On 27 August, Bangu made his Serie C debut for Vicenza in a 3–0 home win over Gubbio, he was replaced by Eric Lanini in the 81st minute.

2018–19 season: Loans to Matera and Bisceglie 
On 31 January 2019, he joined Serie C club Bisceglie on loan until the end of the season.

Gubbio
On 20 August 2019, he signed a three-year contract with Serie C club Gubbio. His Gubbio contract was terminated by mutual consent on 15 February 2021.

International career
Bangu debuted for the DR Congo U20 in an 8-0 friendly loss to the England U17s on 7 October 2015.

References

External links
 

1997 births
Footballers from Kinshasa
Living people
Democratic Republic of the Congo footballers
Association football midfielders
Democratic Republic of the Congo under-20 international footballers
Serie C players
Serie D players
Reggina 1914 players
L.R. Vicenza players
Matera Calcio players
A.S. Gubbio 1910 players
Aglianese Calcio 1923 players
Democratic Republic of the Congo expatriate footballers
Democratic Republic of the Congo expatriate sportspeople in Italy
Expatriate footballers in Italy
21st-century Democratic Republic of the Congo people